The State Library of Queensland is the main reference and research library provided to the people of the State of Queensland, Australia, by the state government. Its legislative basis is provided by the Queensland Libraries Act 1988. It contains a significant portion of Queensland's documentary heritage, major reference and research collections, and is an advocate of and partner with public libraries across Queensland. The library is at Kurilpa Point, within the Queensland Cultural Centre on the Brisbane River at South Bank.

History 
The Brisbane Public Library was established by the government of the Colony of Queensland in 1896, and was renamed the Public Library of Queensland in 1898. The library was opened to the public in 1902.

In 1934, the Oxley Memorial Library (now the John Oxley Library), named for the explorer John Oxley, opened as a centre for research and study relating specifically to Queensland. The Libraries Act of 1943 established the Library Board of Queensland to manage the Public Library of Queensland; three years later, under the terms of The Oxley Memorial Library of Queensland Act, it took over management of the Oxley Memorial Library as well. 

In March 1947, James L. Stapleton was appointed Queensland's first State Librarian. Stapleton advocated for a new building for the library and that library services should be free to the public. He remains the longest-serving CEO (1947-1970), and has been followed by five others: Sydney Lawrence (Lawrie) Ryan 1970 -1988, Des Stephens 1988-2001, Lea Giles-Peters (the first woman to be appointed to the position), 2001-2011, Janette Wright,  2012-2015 and from 2016, Vicki McDonald.

In 1971, the "Public Library" became the "State Library." The following year, the Public Library Service was established to liaise with Queensland local authorities regarding their public libraries; a subsidy for employing qualified staff in public libraries was also established. A few years later the Country Lending Service was established to provide book exchange and other services to public libraries in Queensland's smaller local government areas. Under the new name of Rural Libraries Queensland, the service is still going strong today, administered by the State Library's Public and Indigenous Library Services program.

In 2003, the State Library began a new mission of establishing Indigenous Knowledge Centres (IKCs) in the Cape York and Torres Strait areas. There is now a network of 22 IKCs in remote and regional communities: across Cape York, the islands of the Torres Strait, Central Queensland and at Cherbourg in South East Queensland.

The State Library's current strategic vision is to enrich the lives of Queenslanders through creatively engaging people with information, knowledge and community.

In early 2011, the library donated 50,000 pictures to Wikimedia Commons.

Collection and services
The State Library holds general collections, including books, journals and magazines, newspapers, audiovisual items, family history, maps, music, ephemera, Internet and electronic resources.  There are research collections and services – including the John Oxley Library and the Australian Library of Art, which includes the James Hardie Library of Australian Fine Arts.

The collection is home to six UNESCO Memory of the World significant collections:

 Margaret Lawrie Collection of Torres Strait Islands, 1964–1998 
 Manifesto of the Queensland Labour Party, 1892
 The Convict Records of Queensland, 1825-1842
 James Tyson Papers, 1834-1965 
 Anzac Day Commemoration Committee, 1916-1922
 The Johnstone Gallery Archive, 1948-1992

State Library holds a number of significant collections of material documenting Queensland history;  

 Queensland election-related material, including websites, posters, flyers and how-to-vote cards.; 
 Frank and Eunice Corley House Photographs Collection, which contained more than 60,000 photographs of Brisbane suburbia;  
 Richard Stringer Architectural Photography Archive, includes over 63,000 photographic negatives and approximately 100,000 digital images, providing a substantial documentary record of Queensland’s built heritage from 1967-2021.

Services
 Access to collections, including access to 50,000 Copyright-free Queensland images through Wikimedia Commons
 Provides books and other resource material to public libraries throughout Queensland.
 Specialist services to public libraries in a number of areas, including services to young people and multicultural communities 
 Public programs and exhibitions, including exhibition loans to schools, museums and other community organisations.
 Outreach programs in reference, research, information literacy, Internet training and digitisation throughout Queensland for public library staff and the general community.
 Library services to Aboriginal people and Torres Strait Islanders including the establishment of Indigenous Knowledge Centres primarily in Cape York and Torres Strait regions and increasing the employment and training opportunities for Indigenous peoples in the library industry.
 A digital culture centre called The Edge, for young people.
 A free coworking space, the Business Studio, supports startups, entrepreneurs and small business.
 kuril dhagun Indigenous Knowledge Centre
 The Corner, an activities area for children under 8, their parents, carers, educators and friends.

Exhibitions
The library has hosted a number of prominent exhibitions, including:
 100 not out: a century of Queensland sporting memories (3 August - 17 November 2002)
 A Few of our Favourite Things (25 November 2006 – 11 March 2007)
 Bold but Faithful: John Oxley Library at work (4 April - 11 October 2009)
 Transforming Tindale (6 September 2012 - 9 December 2012)
 Plantation Voices (16 February - 8 September 2019)
 Home: A Suburban Obsession (7 December 2018 – 14 July 2019)
 Islands: hidden histories from Queensland Islands (30 Jun 2018 – 27 January 2019)
 Hot Modernism (9 July – 12 October 2014)

Tours
Free guided tours of the building are available. In 2010, a total of 3730 school students participated in a tour.

Rural Libraries Queensland 
Rural Libraries Queensland (formerly the Country Library Service) is a collaboration between the State Library of Queensland and approximately 30 of the local government councils to provide library libraries to rural communities.

National edeposit (NED)
As a member library of National and State Libraries Australia, the organisation collaborated on the creation of the National edeposit (NED) system, which enables publishers from all over Australia to upload electronic publications as per the 2016 amendment to the Copyright Act 1968 and other regional legislation relating to legal deposit, and makes these publications publicly accessible online (depending on access conditions) from anywhere via Trove.

Architecture 

The Brisbane Public Library moved into the Old State Library Building in William Street, Brisbane in 1899. This building had formerly been occupied by the Queensland Museum.

The Library originally shared accommodation in the building with an art gallery. In the late 1950s, an extension, with a distinctive tiled mural by Lindsay Edward on the exterior, was built onto the building to provide more space.  The mural was the winning design in a national competition held in 1958.

In 1988, the year of Brisbane's World Expo 88, the State Library of Queensland moved to a new home within the Queensland Cultural Centre at South Bank, near the Queensland Museum and the original Queensland Art Gallery, on the site of the former St Helen's Methodist Hospital, South Brisbane. This new building, a C-shaped edifice of straight-faced concrete and glass built around a mature Poinciana tree overlooking the Brisbane River, was the work of architectural firm, Robin Gibson and Partners,  and marked the completion of Gibson's ambitious Queensland Cultural Centre project.

In 2004, work began on the Millennium Library Project - a major  redevelopment of the existing State Library building. After three years of extensive redevelopment, the South Bank building officially re-opened on 25 November 2006 as "a new cultural and knowledge destination" and a fitting showcase for the collections. 

This major redevelopment was the work of Brisbane-based architecture firms Donovan Hill and Peddle Thorp. Their work earned them several awards - the prestigious RAIA Sir Zelman Cowen Award for Public Architecture, 2007 (award for best public building in Australia), the RAIA Emil Sodersten Award for Interior Architecture, 2007, the RAIA Queensland Architecture Award for Brisbane Building of the Year 2007, the RAIA FDG Stanley Award for Public Buildings Architecture 2007, and the AIB Queensland Award for Project of the Year + Sustainability Commendation, 2007.   

The Donovan Hill/Peddle Thorp additions transformed the State Library building, reconfiguring the entrance, adding another level and doubling its size with an additional 12,000 sqm of new space.    Although the elements of the original Gibson scheme were preserved in the renovation, the building was deemed too altered to be included in the 2015 State Heritage Listing of the Cultural Centre. 

The State Library building has since been described as an “open, generous knowledge place,” and one of Australia's "most cherished public living rooms".

The building overlooks Stanley Place between the Queensland Art Gallery and the Queensland Gallery of Modern Art.

Governance
The State Library of Queensland is governed by the Library Board of Queensland and comprises the following program units:

Content Development
 Queensland Memory
 Discovery
 Information Communications and Technology Services

Regional Access and Public Libraries
 Literacy and Young People
 Public Library Development
 Regional Partnerships
 SLQ Cairns

Engagement and Partnerships
 Indigenous Services
 Visitor Experience 
 Learning and Participation
 The Edge
 Asia Pacific Design Library
 Business Studio
 Government Research and Information Library

Corporate Services
 Finance, Facilities & Administration
 HR Consultancy 
 Strategic Reporting
 People and Planning

Office of the State Librarian
 Communications
 Queensland Library Foundation

Queensland Business Leaders Hall of Fame 
In 2009 State Library of Queensland, the Queensland Library Foundation and QUT Business School at Queensland University of Technology collaborated to establish the Queensland Business Leaders Hall of Fame initiative. The QBLHOF recognises outstanding contributions made by organisations, companies and individuals to develop the Queensland economy and society, both contemporary and historical. A governing committee determines a list of inductees based on a set of criteria including:
 Sustained leadership
 Major financial contribution 
 Pioneering
 Outstanding contribution 
 Achievement of iconic status
The inductees are announced each year in July at a gala event. Since 2014 the QBLHOF has also awarded an annual Fellowship, to recipients working on a research project that utilises the resources of the John Oxley Library to produce new interpretations of Queensland's business history.

See also

SLQ donation of images to Wikimedia Commons in December 2010
Walker, Paul. Millennium Library [Donovan Hill and Peddle Thorp rework Robin Gibson's State Library of Queensland edifice] Architecture Australia Vol 96 No 2 Mar/Apr 2007 pp 64–73

References

External links 

A brief history of the Australian Library of Art
A brief history of the John Oxley Library
SLQ Blogs
Music Queensland – tune in to scores of musical heritage
Timelapse videos of building redevelopment – Part 1, Part 2 and Part 3.
Libraries Act 1988 (Queensland)
Queensland Business Leaders Hall of Fame
State Library of Queensland Discover Queensland Buildings Website 
State Library of Queensland Building Photographs 2006, State Library of Queensland 

Buildings and structures in Brisbane
Queensland, State Library of
Tourist attractions in Brisbane
Government buildings completed in 1988
Brutalist architecture in Australia
Libraries in Brisbane
Archives in Australia
Library buildings completed in 2006
Landmarks in Brisbane
South Brisbane, Queensland
Queensland Cultural Centre